FeGiS (German acronym for: Früherkennung von Gefahrenstellen im Straßenverkehr, English acronym EDDA: Early Detection of Dangerous Areas in road traffic) is a road traffic safety research project for the early identification of danger points in road traffic and for the prevention of traffic accidents in Germany. The project was launched in December 2017 and is funded by the "mFund" of the Federal Ministry of Transport and Digital Infrastructure already in the second funding stage, thanks to the successful completion of the FeGiS feasibility study in 2018.

Project approach 
The idea of FeGiS is to compare danger points in road traffic reported by road users from all over Germany via crowdsourcing (on the platform gefahrenstellen.de / dangerspots.org) with other data sources such as official accident data and kinematic data (vehicle motion data from Cars and Smartphones). The combination and analysis of these Data sets are intended to proactively identify hazard points at an early stage and to weight them using a "hazard score". On the one hand, this information about danger spots is to be incorporated into intelligent applications for road users. Such applications can emit warning messages in good time and indicate safer routes for roads, cycle paths and footpaths. On the other hand, these continuously updated data sets are to be compiled on a web platform and made available to participants in road safety work such as local authorities, police, science, engineering firms for traffic planning, navigation providers and car manufacturers for road safety and prevention work throughout Germany (e.g. Road safety audit). For data to be updated regularly, uniform data formats and automated interfaces for the various data sources as well as guidelines for data protection are to be defined. 
FeGiS thus wants to create a new database for up-to-date information about danger spots. Hence, the research project can make an important contribution to more safety on the roads in Germany.

Background 
While it was possible to achieve a continuous reduction in the number of road fatalities in Germany by 2010, the number of all accidents and injuries has risen again over the last decade. Causes for this development can be found, for example, in increased traffic volume, stress in everyday life, or distractions while driving. Therefore, dangerous situations are often not correctly assessed or they are recognised too late. 
Early recognition of danger points can prevent accidents by timely warnings of danger zones for road users or by eliminating the danger through appropriate measures. Also the European Commission pursues the "Vision Zero" (zero road fatalities) and hence, outlines the proactive identification of danger points in road traffic as one of its priorities in the EU Road Safety Policy Framework 2021–2030.

Successes to date 
The feasibility study of the project was also sponsored by the "mFund" of the Federal Ministry of Transport and Digital Infrastructure. During this first funding stage, the crowdsourcing platform "gefahrenstellen.de / dangerspots.org" developed by the "Initiative for Safer Roads" in cooperation with the Institute for Road Engineering at RWTH Aachen University (ISAC), was successfully tested between 2017 and 2018. The focus was on the cities of Bonn and Aachen. Thanks to the extensive reporting in Newspapers, Web portals, and on radio and TV, a total of 1,500 danger reports with around 3,500 supporters were generated for the two cities over a period of approximately 6 months. A subsequent research analysis by RWTH Aachen University confirmed the high validity of the hazard reports. In addition to the identification of already known accident black spots, road users also reported danger spots that had not yet become conspicuous due to accidents, but showed a high risk potential during site inspections. This form of crowdsourcing was thus confirmed as a method for the early detection of danger points, so that it was decided to continue the project with an extended project approach.

The project consortium 
Since the launch of the FeGiS feasibility study in 2017 the consortium coordinator "Initiative for Safer Roads" collaborates with the Institute of Highway Engineering at the RWTH Aachen University (ISAC). For the further development of the project to the advanced version FeGiS+ (EDDA+), the project consortium has been extended to also include the following additional partners: German Police University – Department of Traffic Science & Traffic Psychology, PTV Planung Transport Verkehr AG and DTV-Verkehrsconsult GmbH.

Development of FeGiS+ (EDDA+) 
During the second funding stage between 2019 and 2022 the FeGiS concept is further developed towards the model presented above (see project approach). The focus during this development phase lies on analysing the correlation between the different data streams and on aggregating the information to extract "smart data" as a result. Such data will be tailored and adapted to the needs of the different user groups. The extensive experience and knowledge of the partners of FeGiS+ will be instrumental in the further development of the project. Furthermore, the intention of FeGiS+ is to generate a new database for up-to-date information about danger spots and thus, the FeGiS+ approach could also serve as blueprint for other countries (road safety in Europe). In this line, the development plan of the research project also includes a test of the applicability of the FeGiS+ approach in neighbouring European countries.

External links 
Website dangerspots.org / gefahrenstellen.de
Website Federal Ministry of Transport and Digital Infrastructure project presentation FeGiS+
FeGiS+ on website of German Police University
FeGiS+ / EDDA+ on website of RWTH Aachen University
FeGiS+ on website of DTV-Verkehrsconsult
gefahrenstellen.de on website of german newspaper "General-Anzeiger Bonn"

References 

Road traffic management